Tatranská Lomnica is a part of the town of Vysoké Tatry in northern Slovakia in the Tatras.

References 

Strbske Pleso
Ski areas and resorts in Slovakia